Edward Slater Crawford III (July 25, 1934 – July 9, 2017) was an American football player who played for the New York Giants of the National Football League (NFL). He played college baseball, basketball,  and football at the University of Mississippi. He died of Alzheimer's disease in 2017.

References

1934 births
2017 deaths
American football defensive backs
New York Giants players
Ole Miss Rebels baseball players
Ole Miss Rebels football players
Ole Miss Rebels men's basketball players
People from Corinth, Mississippi
American men's basketball players
Deaths from dementia in Mississippi
Deaths from Alzheimer's disease